John Lewis (born 15 October 1955) is a former Welsh footballer.

Career

Lewis was born in Tredegar and was spotted by Cardiff City while playing for Pontllanfraith in a Welsh Football League match and was quickly offered a contract by then manager Jimmy Andrews. He made his Cardiff debut against Blackburn Rovers in September 1978. He went on to become a regular fixture in the Bluebirds line-up over the next few years before eventually leaving the club along with Linden Jones and Tarki Micallef to join Newport County in a swap deal that saw Nigel Vaughan and Karl Elsey go the other way and join Cardiff.

After establishing himself in the County side he went on to become the club's player-manager when Jimmy Mullen left for Aberdeen in 1987 but could not prevent the club being relegated in the 1986–87 season and was subsequently sacked after Newport took only one point from their first six games in the following season. He moved on to spend one season at Swansea City making 25 appearances before moving to Hereford before retiring.

Wales Under-21s 
He also made one appearance for the Wales under-21 team.

Coaching career
Lewis was manager at Newport County and Merthyr. In February 2006 returned to Merthyr as coach.

Managerial statistics

References

1955 births
Living people
Sportspeople from Tredegar
Welsh footballers
Wales under-21 international footballers
English Football League players
Cardiff City F.C. players
Newport County A.F.C. players
Swansea City A.F.C. players
Abergavenny Thursdays F.C. players
Welsh football managers
Newport County A.F.C. managers
Merthyr Tydfil F.C. managers
Rhayader Town F.C. players
Association football midfielders
Bohemian F.C. players
Llanelli Town A.F.C. players
Ebbw Vale F.C. players
Barry Town United F.C. players
Pontllanfraith A.F.C. players
Merthyr Tydfil F.C. players